Oscar Mason Gatey Allen (born 19 March 1999) is a professional Australian rules footballer playing for the West Coast Eagles in the Australian Football League (AFL). He made his debut in round 16 of the 2018 season against the Greater Western Sydney Giants at Perth Stadium.

Junior career 
Allen is from Perth, Western Australia. He played junior football at Whitford Junior Football Club, but also played basketball. As a junior, he played as a small defender, before a  growth spurt at 16 meant he started to play key-position roles. Allen joined West Australian Football League club West Perth in 2016. He initially played at colts level. At West Perth, Allen played as an inside midfielder, a centre-half forward, a centre half-back and a ruckman.

He played for his state as co-captain in the 2017 AFL Under 18 Championships and won the Larke Medal as the best player in the first division after kicking 11 goals over four games. Allen said he was "really excited" about the award, but it "wasn't something that went to [his] head". He played as a centre half-forward, but was named in the Under 18 All-Australian side as a full-forward, confusing WA coach Peter Sumich. Allen was lauded as a possible early pick in the 2017 national draft after his performance. He was compared to former St Kilda captain Nick Riewoldt by his West Perth coach Bill Monaghan, and to Essendon forward Jake Stringer. Allen played two reserves matches with West Perth, where he played with his older brother Angus. He also played two senior matches to give him experience at a higher level.

AFL career 
After speculation that West Coast would take Allen with their first selection (pick 13) in the 2017 draft, he was eventually selected by the club with pick 21. He arrived at the Eagles with a tibia stress fracture, which Allen believed was character building. Forwards coach Jaymie Graham said that senior players were impressed with his work ethic. On debut against the GWS Giants, he accumulated seven disposals at 100% efficiency, two marks and three tackles. Allen singled out his smother on Giant Matt de Boer and watching Nic Naitanui take a flying mark as highlights. Allen played a defensive role in his AFL debut with West Coast, but said that he was happy wherever coach Adam Simpson played him and that he was sure he would play as a forward at some point.

Personal life 
Allen has two brothers: Gareth, a lacrosse player who won a bronze medal for Australia at the 2010 World Lacrosse Championship in Manchester; and Angus, who plays for West Perth Football Club's reserves.

References

External links 

 
 

Living people
1999 births
West Perth Football Club players
West Coast Eagles players
Australian rules footballers from Perth, Western Australia
East Perth Football Club players